Ovid Densusianu (also known under his pen name Ervin; 29 December 1873, Făgăraș – 9 June 1938, Bucharest) was a Romanian poet, philologist, linguist, folklorist, literary historian and critic, chief of a poetry school, university professor and journalist. He is known for introducing new trends of European modernism into Romanian literature.

The son of Aron Densușianu, a university professor at the University of Iași, and Elena (b. Circa), he received a degree from the Faculty of Letters, University of Iași, in 1892. Between 1893 and 1895, he studied in Berlin, Germany, and Paris, France. After he received his diploma from the École pratique des hautes études, Paris, in 1896, he worked his way up at the University of Bucharest, eventually becoming a professor in 1901. In 1918, he became a full member of the Romanian Academy.

Densusianu was briefly married to Elena Bacaloglu, who later came to admire fascism and organized the National Italo-Romanian Cultural and Economic Movement. He is buried at Bellu Cemetery, in Bucharest.

Streets in Călan, Hațeg, Oradea, and Pitești are named after him. A county library in Deva and schools in Călan, Făgăraș, and Hațeg also bear his name.

Writings (selection)
, Firmin Didot et cie, Paris, 1896. 
, Paris, 1896. 
, București, 1898.
, E. Bouillon, Paris, 1899. 
, Institutul de Arte Grafice and Editură Minerva, București, 1899. 
, E. Leroux, Paris, 1901. 
, București, 1910; second edition, București, 1937
, București, 1911
, Editura Vieței Nouă, București, 1912. 
, București, 1913
, Editura Vieața nouă, București, 1914. 
, Socec, București, 1915. 
, Editura Vieața nouă, București, 1916. 
, București, 1918
, Editura Vieața nouă, București, 1911. 
, București, 1919
, București, 1920–1933; re-edited by I. Șerb, București, 1985
, Editura Vieața nouă, București, 1921. 
, Ancora, București, 1921. 
, Editura Casei Școalelor, București, 1922. 
, București, 1922–1923; second edition, București, 1943
, H. D'Arthez, Paris; Vieața Nouă, București, 1924. 
, București, 1924–1938
, Socec, București, 1925. 
, E. Droz, Paris, 1934. 
, edited and foreword by Marin Bucur, Ed. pentru literatură, București, 1966. 
, edited by B. Cazacu, V. Rusu, and I. Șerb, București, 1968–1985
, edited and foreword by Călin Manilici, Cluj-Napoca, 1980
, București, 1998

References
Aurel Sasu, Dicționarul biografic al literaturii române (A-L), Paralela 45, Pitești, 2006, pp. 476–477 
Ion Diaconu și Ioan Șerb (eds.), Ovid Densusianu în amintirea și conștiința critică românească, Editura "Grai și suflet" – Cultura Naţională, 2005, XXII 

1873 births
1938 deaths
People from Făgăraș
Alexandru Ioan Cuza University alumni
École pratique des hautes études alumni
Romanian folklorists
Linguists from Romania
Romanian philologists
Romanian poets
Romanian male poets
Academic staff of the University of Bucharest
Titular members of the Romanian Academy
Burials at Bellu Cemetery
Romanian ethnographers